Al-Badiyah or Al-Bidyah is a settlement in the Emirate of Fujairah, the United Arab Emirates. It is the site of a historical mosque of the same name, which is the oldest functional mosque in the country, dating back to the 15th century.

Portuguese fort
Remains of a Portuguese era fort have been discovered in the village by a team of Australian archaeologists. The fort, originally called 'Libidia', was identified from a 16th-century map. Its walls were constructed using rock recovered from a nearby tower dated back to the third millennium BCE. Finds at the site of the fort include locally made pottery dating back to the 17th and 18th centuries, and charcoal samples unearthed were carbon dated to 1450–1600, within the context of the Portuguese presence in the Gulf.

References

External links

Populated places in the Emirate of Fujairah
Villages in the United Arab Emirates